Bridwell is a surname. Notable people with the surname include:

Al Bridwell (1884–1969), American baseball player
Ben Bridwell (born 1978), American musician
E. Nelson Bridwell (1931–1987), American writer
Gene Porter Bridwell (born 1935), American director
Jim Bridwell (1944-2018), American rock climber
Lowell K. Bridwell (1924–1986), American journalist
Norman Bridwell (1928-2014), American writer
Parker Bridwell (born 1991), American baseball player